Gardangah (also Romanized as Gardangāh; also known as Gardanga, Gardenak, and Gerdang) is a village in Ludab Rural District, Ludab District, Boyer-Ahmad County, Kohgiluyeh and Boyer-Ahmad Province, Iran. At the 2006 census, its population was 137, in 32 families.

References 

Populated places in Boyer-Ahmad County